Lake Country is a district municipality with a population of approximately 15,000 in the Okanagan Valley region of British Columbia, Canada. It is a part of the Central Okanagan Regional District, and of the Kelowna metropolitan area. The city of Kelowna lies to the south, while the city of Vernon lies to the north. As its name suggests, there are a number of lakes in the vicinity of Lake Country, and outside the municipal boundaries in the hills to the east. Okanagan Lake defines the western boundary of the municipality, while the entirety of Wood Lake and the southernmost portion of Kalamalka Lake are encompassed by it.

Lake Country was incorporated in 1995. The previously unincorporated communities of Winfield, Okanagan Centre, Oyama, and Carr's Landing were united to form the new municipality, and they remain as separate wards within it. In the municipal government, one councillor is drawn from each of these wards, while the mayor and two additional councillors are elected by the people at large.

Wards
Lake Country is the only municipality in the province of British Columbia to have the ward system.

The four wards of Lake Country are:

Demographics

Statistics Canada 2006 census:

Age
Median Age: 43.2
Aged 15 and Over: 83.4%

Immigration
Canadian Born: 8360 (87.6%)
Immigrated pre-1991: 950 (10.0%)
Immigrated 1991–2006: 225 (2.4%)

Income
Average Earnings: $24,654 (employed – 6,150 people)
Average Earnings: $40,040 (employed full-time, year-round – 2,975 people)
Median Income, Persons Aged 15 and Over: $25,477 (7,650 people)

Ethnicity

Religion 
According to the 2021 census, religious groups in Lake Country included:
Irreligion (9,080 persons or 58.1%)
Christianity (6,060 persons or 38.8%)
Sikhism (170 persons or 1.1%)
Hinduism (55 persons or 0.4%)
Buddhism (35 persons or 0.2%)
Islam (35 persons or 0.2%)
Judaism (25 persons or 0.2%)
Other (155 persons or 1.0%)

According to the 2001 Canadian census, religious groups in Lake Country included:
No religion: 3,585 (38.7%) 
Protestant: 3,310 (35.7%)
Roman Catholic 1535 (16.6%) 
Other Christian: 580 (6.3%) 
Other religions: 240 (2.6%)

Government

Municipal
Municipal elections were last held on November 20, 2018. At that time, James Baker was elected mayor for a fifth term. Representing the four wards of the municipality are Blair Ireland (Okanagan Centre), Cara Reed (Carr's Landing), Jerremy Kozub (Winfield), and Todd McKenzie (Oyama). The two councillors at large are Bill Scarrow, and Penny Gambell.

Provincial

Provincially, Lake Country is part of the constituency of Kelowna—Lake Country, this seat having been occupied by Norm Letnick of the BC Liberal Party since May 2009.

Federal
Federally, Lake Country is part of the riding of Kelowna—Lake Country. Despite the similarity in nomenclature, the federal riding encompasses a greater area and population than its provincial counterpart. Tracy Gray of the Conservative Party was first elected as MP in October 2019.

Education
Public education in Lake Country is provided by School District 23 Central Okanagan. Three elementary schools are located in the Municipality: Davidson Road Elementary, Oyama Traditional School, and Peter Greer Elementary. All three cover Kindergarten to Grade 6. Lake Country is also home to George Elliot Secondary, which covers Grades 7 to 12.

The two largest institutions providing post-secondary education in the area of Lake Country are UBC Okanagan, the campus which lies in north Kelowna, and Okanagan College, which has campuses in Kelowna and Coldstream.

Transportation
Lake Country is situated on the major north-south route through the Okanagan valley, Highway 97, approximately 15 km of which lies within the municipality, passing through Winfield and Oyama. To the south, the highway provides a route to Kelowna, whose downtown core is 20 km south of the municipal boundary. Glenmore Road provides an alternate route to Kelowna. To the north, the highway leads to Vernon, whose downtown is 15 km north of the municipal boundary. Vernon can also be accessed via Commonage Road. Until 2013, the highway was only four-laned through Winfield and north of Oyama, while the section from Winfield to Oyama was two-laned. This two-laned section of Highway 97 became notorious for several major accidents and congestion and the highway was upgraded to a four-lane limited-access road, officially opened on August 16, 2013. The new highway was relocated further to the west of Wood Lake and the old highway was renamed to Pelmewash Parkway to accommodate future recreational corridor.

A regular public bus service by Kelowna Regional Transit System, route 23, is available from Winfield to Kelowna at the UBC Okanagan exchange. A less frequent peak hour express service by Vernon Regional Transit System, route 90, is also available, connecting Oyama and Winfield with Vernon and UBC Okanagan exchange. A new bus service, route 32, establishes connections throughout the various communities in Lake Country.

Lake Country is in close proximity to Kelowna International Airport, which lies only 8 km to the south, and provides regular service to major cities such as Vancouver, Victoria, Seattle, Los Angeles, Calgary, Edmonton, and Toronto.

Accolades
In 2016, Lake Country was one of five communities in British Columbia honoured with the Small Business Roundtable's Open for Business Award in recognition of local efforts to foster economic growth.

Notes

References

External links
 
 

District municipalities in British Columbia
 
Populated places in the Regional District of Central Okanagan
Populated places on Okanagan Lake
Populated places in the Okanagan Country